Atin Ghosh is an Indian politician who is serving as a sitting member of West Bengal Legislative Assembly from Kashipur-Belgachhia constituency since 6 May 2021. He was there as Deputy Mayor of Kolkata Municipal Corporation from 2018 to 2021. He represents All India Trinamool Congress.

References

West Bengal politicians
Living people
Year of birth missing (living people)